EduCity Sports Complex is a sports complex in Iskandar Puteri,  Johor, Malaysia.

History 
EduCity Sports Complex was launched by Dato' Sri Hajji Mohammad Najib bin Tun Haji Abdul Razak on 26 January 2014, Sunday.

Architecture

Main stadium  
EduCity Main Stadium is a 6,000 seater Stadium including a running track and football pitch.

Indoor Arena 
EduCity Indoor Arena is a 1500 seater multi function court, suitable for basketball, badminton, table tennis, and martial arts type events.

Gymnasium

Outdoor Courts 
3 outdoor tennis courts
1 volley ball court
1 futsal court
1 kickboxing ring

Aquatic 
EduCity Aquatics Centre consists of a 50m swimming pool, with seating for 500 spectators.

Sports 
Athletics
Badminton
Basketball
Boot camp
Football
Futsal
Muay Thai
Personal training
Pilates/Yoga
Scuba diving
Swimming
Table tennis
Tennis
Volleyball
Weight training
Zumba

Transportation

Closest bus stations 
University of Reading (Malaysia) 
Newcastle University of Medicine (Malaysia) 
Opposite Mydin Anjung 
Before Persiaran Mega 
After Persiaran Mega

References 

Buildings and structures in Iskandar Puteri
Sports venues in Johor